Cardiff is a town in Jefferson County, Alabama, United States west of Gardendale. At the 2010 census the population was 55, placing it as the least-populated incorporated area in Jefferson County. It is named after the capital of Wales.  It is one of four Jefferson County cities named after cities in Great Britain, the others being Birmingham, Leeds and Brighton.

Geography
Cardiff is located at  (33.645384, −86.932965). on Five Mile Creek, a tributary of the Locust Fork of the Black Warrior River. It is immediately downstream of Brookside. The region is part of the Cumberland Plateau, with shallow but deeply incised stream valleys dissecting sedimentary rock, including significant seams of bituminous coal.

Demographics

As of the census of 2000, there were 82 people, 33 households, and 26 families residing in the town. The racial makeup of the town was 93.90% White and 6.10% Black or African American.

There were 33 households, out of which 27.3% had children under the age of 18 living with them, 60.6% were married couples living together, 12.1% had a female householder with no husband present, and 21.2% were non-families. 18.2% of all households were made up of individuals, and 12.1% had someone living alone who was 65 years of age or older. The average household size was 2.48 and the average family size was 2.85.

In the town, the population was spread out, with 22.0% under the age of 18, 8.5% from 18 to 24, 32.9% from 25 to 44, 18.3% from 45 to 64, and 18.3% who were 65 years of age or older. The median age was 40 years. For every 100 females, there were 86.4 males. For every 100 females age 18 and over, there were 88.2 males.

The median income for a household in the town was $34,107, and the median income for a family was $45,000. Males had a median income of $28,906 versus $18,125 for females. The per capita income for the town was $16,067. There were 5.6% of families and 8.1% of the population living below the poverty line, including no under eighteens and none of those over 64.

History
Coal mining was the historical basis of the economy. The town, for years the smallest incorporated town in the State of Alabama, declined along with the decline of underground coal mining and the rise of strip mining. The epochal flood of May 2003 destroyed a number of buildings in that part of Cardiff close to Five Mile Creek. The town is now but a dent in the land; scarce of life with a scant 20–30 people and covered with kudzu. Cardiff is becoming a ghost town.

References

Towns in Jefferson County, Alabama
Towns in Alabama
Birmingham metropolitan area, Alabama